New Hampshire elected its members August 18, 1820.

See also 
 1820 and 1821 United States House of Representatives elections
 List of United States representatives from New Hampshire

1820
New Hampshire
United States House of Representatives